Haeundae District is a district (gu) of Busan, South Korea.

Haeundae has a population of about 423,000, the most populous district of Busan with 11.6% of the city population, and covers an area of 51.44 km² (19.86 sq mi) in eastern Busan. Haeundae became a division of Busan Metropolitan City in 1976 and attained the status of district in 1980. 

Haeundae is linked to Busan Subway Line 2 and train stations on the Donghae Nambu railway line.

History

Haeundae takes its name from the ninth century Silla scholar and poet Choi Chi-won (literary name Haeun, or "Sea and Clouds"), who, according to a historical account, admired the view from the beach and built a pavilion nearby. A piece of Choi's calligraphy, which he engraved on a rock at Haeundae, still exists. On Haeundae Dongbaek Island, there is a statue of Choe Chiwon, a Confucian scholar of the Unified Silla Period, and a monument. During the reign of Queen Jinseong during the Unified Silla Period, Choi Chiwon lamented that there was no place to write his studies.

Haeundae used to be isolated from the large communities in Busan and Busanjin. It remained undeveloped until the late 1970s and early 1980s. A small number of luxury hotels were constructed after the 1988 Seoul Olympics. More hotels and other tourist facilities have been constructed on the beach-front area since the mid-1990s, and shopping malls and movie theatre complexes have been built in the 'centre' of Haeundae: an area between Haeundae Station and the beach. The area has continued to grow, apart from during the Asian financial crisis of 1997.

Haeundae has been a regular host of the annual Busan International Film Festival (BIFF). Haeundae's Dongbaek Island was the location for the 2005 APEC Conference.

Haeundae New Town (해운대 신시가지, 海雲臺 新市街地, Haeundae Sinsigaji), a major commercial and residential redevelopment project begun in 1990, is located in the Jwa-dong area. This area lies in the southern shadow of Jangsan mountain to the north, and is bounded in the south by Haeundae Station on the Dalmaji Gogae line of the Korean National Railroad. Another development project, Centum City, has been ongoing since early 2000 and is now a major feature of Busan. Marine City, located nearby, is constructed on land reclaimed from the sea, and has several huge, high-rise apartment blocks. Additional apartment blocks are under construction, with water resorts and related facilities, for use by the public, also planned for Marine City.

Geography

Haeundae Dalmaji Hill
Haeundae's Dalmaji Hill is touted as one of the eight attractions of Busan, and is noted for its scenic view of the moon. Choe Chi-won (857-10th century), an official and poet from the late Unified Silla Dynasty (668-935), was so struck by its beauty that he decided to extend his stay there. The hill's winding trail that juxtaposes with the ocean is truly awe-inspiring. Some even say that Dalmaji Hill is Busan's answer to Montmartre.

Haeundae Beach
 

Haeundae beach is regarded as one of the most famous beaches in South Korea.

Film and television
Haeundae is popular in South Korean media as a setting or filming location. The district was the setting of the movie Haeundae, a South Korean disaster movie scenario of an immense tsunami hitting the city of Busan.  Haeundae has been featured in numerous K-Dramas, with the beach and Dongbaekseom Island being used as a filming location for Seoul Broadcasting System's 2008 drama Star's Lover. The island was the location for the scene where Lee Ma-ri, played by Choi Ji-woo confesses her love for Kim Chul Soo, played by Yoo Ji-tae; and the couple takes a walk on the beach. In 2012, KBS2 broadcast a drama, Haeundae Lovers, using Busan and the district as a backdrop. Much of the story takes place in Cheongsapo, a coastal community in the district east of Haeundae Beach.

Hauendae is home to the Busan Cinema Center, the location of the annual Busan International Film Festival, which features 5 inside theaters and 1 outside theater.

Administrative divisions

Haeundae-gu is divided into 7 legal dong, which altogether comprise 18 administrative dong, as follows:

 U-dong (2 administrative dong)
 Jung-dong (2 administrative dong)
 Jwa-dong (4 administrative dong)
 Songjeong-dong
 Banyeo-dong (4 administrative dong)
 Bansong-dong (3 administrative dong)
 Jaesong-dong (2 administrative dong)

Notable people
 Jeung Eun-ji (Singer, Apink)
 An Jae Mo (Actor)
 Kang Seung-yoon (Singer, WINNER)
 Park Ji-won (Singer, fromis_9)

Gallery

See also
 Busan
 Busan International Film Festival
 Centum City
 Geography of South Korea

References

External links
 Haeundae-gu website  (in English)
 Haeundae tour website (in English)

 
Districts of Busan